Wolf Bauer (born 5 March 1939 in Steinach, Thuringia) is a German politician and member of the conservative CDU. A pharmacist by profession, he was a member of the Bundestag from 1987 to 2009, representing Euskirchen – Rhein-Erft-Kreis II. Wolf Bauer is an honorary citizen of Astrakhan, Russia.

See also 
 List of German Christian Democratic Union politicians

References

External links 
 Official website 

1939 births
Living people
People from Sonneberg (district)
University of Cologne alumni
University of Bonn alumni
Members of the Bundestag for North Rhine-Westphalia
Members of the Bundestag 2005–2009
Members of the Bundestag 2002–2005
Members of the Bundestag 1998–2002
Members of the Bundestag 1994–1998
Members of the Bundestag 1990–1994
Members of the Bundestag 1987–1990
Members of the Bundestag for the Christian Democratic Union of Germany